Kirill Gotovtsev (born 17 July 1987) is a Russian rugby union player who generally plays as a prop represents Russia internationally. Previously a freestyle wrestler, bronze medallist of the 2010 Russian Championship, as well as an brakeman in bobsleigh.

He made his international debut for Russia against Portugal on 13 November 2015.

He was included in the Russian squad for the 2019 Rugby World Cup which is scheduled to be held in Japan for the first time and also marks his first World Cup appearance.

On 28 April 2021, Kirill would travel to England as he signs for Gloucester in the Premiership Rugby competition ahead of the 2021-22 season.

References 

1987 births
Living people
People from Kimovsky District
Russian rugby union players
Russia international rugby union players
Rugby union props
Gloucester Rugby players
Sportspeople from Tula Oblast